Nizar Ibrahim (born in 1982) is a German-Moroccan vertebrate paleontologist and comparative anatomist. He is currently a senior lecturer at the University of Portsmouth. Ibrahim has led several expeditions to Africa's Sahara and is notable for his research on fossil vertebrates from the Kem Kem Group, including pterosaurs, crocodyliforms, and dinosaurs. In recent years, research led by Ibrahim radically changed ideas about the morphology and life habits of one of the largest predatory dinosaurs, Spinosaurus aegyptiacus. Ibrahim also has interests in bioinformatics and contributed to the NSF-funded Phenoscape project. He regularly engages with the public and is a speaker with the National Geographic Speakers Bureau.

Biography

Youth and education 
Nizar Ibrahim was born on 8 September 1982 in Berlin, Germany. He has German and Moroccan ancestry, with his grandfather being the third Prime Minister of Morocco, Abdallah Ibrahim. Since his childhood, he has been very enthusiastic about animals and their diversity, anatomy, and evolution. He also loved fiction and nonfiction stories of adventures around the world. At 5 years old, he decided that he was going to become a paleontologist while reading a book on dinosaurs.

He obtained a Bachelor of science in geology and biology from the University of Bristol in 2006. In 2011, he obtained his PhD from University College Dublin's School of Medicine and Medical Science. He carried out his postdoctoral studies at the University of Chicago for four years.

Career 
He was an assistant professor at the University of Detroit Mercy, where he taught human anatomy, comparative anatomy, and evolution between 2018 and 2020. Ibrahim is a senior lecturer at the University of Portsmouth. In Morocco, he works with a number of Moroccan researchers and students based at Hassan II University. Ibrahim was one of 21 people selected as a TED fellow in 2015, which makes him the "first paleontologist in the history of the program".

Awards and recognition 

 In 2014, he was selected as a member of National Geographic's Emerging Explorer Program.
 In 2015, he was named a TED Fellow.
 In 2015, he was listed in Crain’s “40 Under 40”.
 In 2019, his Spinosaurus discovery was named one of the Top 20 Scientific Discoveries of the Decade by National Geographic.

Selected publications

References

External links 

 Nizar Ibrahim's biography on University of Detroit Mercy

Interview with Dinosaurs expert Nizar Ibrahim on ZDF

Living people
1982 births
German paleontologists
Moroccan paleontologists
People from Berlin

Alumni of the University of Bristol
Alumni of University College Dublin
University of Detroit Mercy faculty